Bluff City, Illinois may refer to:
 Unincorporated communities 
Bluff City, Fayette County, Illinois
Bluff City, Schuyler County, Illinois